Robert Cox is Professor Emeritus at the Lankenau Institute for Medical Research. He is also Emeritus Professor of Physiology at the University of Pennsylvania School of Medicine. Cox earned his B.S. in Electrical Engineering and his M.S. in Biomedical Engineering, both from Drexel University, Philadelphia; he earned his PhD in Biomedical Engineering from the University of Pennsylvania.  His research is focused on how ion channels regulate blood pressure and the electrical signals that drive heartbeat, specifically a type of calcium channel that is present only in arteries.

Books edited
Recent Advances in Arterial Diseases: Atherosclerosis, Hypertension and Vasospasm, ed.  Thomas N. Tulenko and Robert H. Cox (New York: Alan R. Liss, Inc.), 1986.
 Acute Myocardial Infarction: Emerging Concepts of Pathogenesis and Treatment, ed. Robert H. Cox (New York: Praeger), 1989
Cellular and Molecular Mechanisms in Hypertension, ed. Robert H. Cox (New York: Plenum Press), 1989

References

Scientists from Philadelphia
University of Pennsylvania faculty
University of Pennsylvania School of Engineering and Applied Science alumni
American physiologists
Year of birth missing (living people)
Living people
Drexel University alumni